Aa Nimisham is a 1977 Indian Malayalam-language drama film, directed by I. V. Sasi and produced by K. J. Joseph. The film stars Madhu, Sheela, Sridevi and Kaviyoor Ponnamma . The film has musical score by G. Devarajan. The film was remade in Tamil as Nool Veli and in Telugu as Guppedu Manasu.

Plot

Cast

Madhu
Sheela
Sridevi
Kaviyoor Ponnamma
Ashalatha
Francis
Baby Sumathi
Chandrakala
Kuthiravattam Pappu
Ravikumar
Sarala
Alex

Soundtrack
The music was composed by G. Devarajan and the lyrics were written by Yusufali Kechery.

References

External links
 

1977 films
Indian drama films
Films with screenplays by Alleppey Sheriff
1970s Malayalam-language films
Malayalam films remade in other languages
Films directed by I. V. Sasi
1977 drama films